The 2022–23 Brisbane Heat Women's season was the eighth in the team's history. Coached by Ashley Noffke and captained by Jess Jonassen, the Heat finished the regular season of WBBL08 in third position. For the second year in a row, they were eliminated from the tournament during the knockout phase by the Adelaide Strikers.

Squad 
Each 2022–23 squad was made up of 15 active players. Teams could sign up to five 'marquee players', with a maximum of three of those from overseas. Marquees were classed as any overseas player, or a local player who holds a Cricket Australia national contract at the start of the WBBL|08 signing period.

Personnel changes made ahead of the season included:

 South African marquees Anneke Bosch and Nadine de Klerk did not re-sign with the Heat.
 Indian marquee Poonam Yadav did not re-sign with the Heat.
 New Zealand marquee Amelia Kerr returned to the Heat, following a season's absence.
 English marquee Danni Wyatt signed with the Heat, having previously played four seasons for the Melbourne Renegades.
 Indian marquee Pooja Vastrakar signed with the Heat, marking her first appearance in the league.
 New Zealand marquee Jess Kerr signed as a replacement player, marking her first appearance in the league.
 Georgia Prestwidge departed the Heat, signing with the Melbourne Renegades.

The table below lists the Heat players and their key stats (including runs scored, batting strike rate, wickets taken, economy rate, catches and stumpings) for the season.

Ladder

Fixtures 
All times are AEDT.

Regular season

Eliminator

Challenger

Statistics and awards 
 Most runs: Georgia Redmayne – 354 (6th in the league)
 Highest score in an innings: Georgia Redmayne – 98* (67) vs Melbourne Renegades, 18 October 2022
 Most wickets: Jess Jonassen – 25 (2nd in the league)
 Best bowling figures in an innings: Jess Jonassen – 4/23 (4 overs) vs Hobart Hurricanes, 23 November 2022
 Most catches (fielder): Nicola Hancock – 8 (equal 8th in the league)
 Player of the Match awards:
 Amelia Kerr – 3
 Laura Harris – 2
 Grace Harris, Ellie Johnston, Georgia Redmayne, Georgia Voll – 1 each
 WBBL|08 Player of the Tournament: Amelia Kerr (2nd)
 WBBL|08 Team of the Tournament: Nicola Hancock, Jess Jonassen, Amelia Kerr, Georgia Redmayne

References

Further reading

 

2022–23 Women's Big Bash League season by team
Brisbane Heat (WBBL)